Zakary Challen Brown (born November 7, 1971) is an American businessman and former professional racing driver, currently residing in England. He is chief executive officer of McLaren Racing.

Born and raised in California, Brown raced professionally around the world for ten years before developing his skills in motorsport's business and commercial worlds. In 1995, he founded Just Marketing International (JMI), which grew to become the largest motorsport marketing agency in the world. In 2013 JMI was acquired by CSM, a division of Chime Communications Limited, and Brown became the company's CEO. He relinquished that post in the winter of 2016 to focus on his responsibilities with McLaren.

Brown has been recognised by a range of industry bodies and publications, including the Paddock Magazine F1 Power List and his induction into the Sports Business Journal "Forty Under 40" Hall of Fame, where he has been listed three times. He was named Promo Marketer of the Year by PROMO Magazine, and JMI has appeared five times in Inc. Magazine "Inc 500" annual list of the 500 fastest-growing private companies in the United States.

Brown co-founded and co-owns United Autosports, a professional team competing in international sportscar racing and various historic racing events around the world. Through United, he co-owns Supercars Championship team Walkinshaw Andretti United alongside Michael Andretti and Ryan Walkinshaw, as well as Extreme E's Andretti United XE and McLaren XE. He was the non-executive chairman of Motorsport Network, a global market-leading motorsport and automotive digital platform, between 2016 and 2019.

Brown is an avid collector of historical documents and sporting memorabilia, as well as both road and racing cars. He is married and has two sons, McGuire and Maxwell, and lives in Surrey in the United Kingdom.

Racing career
Brown began his racing career in karting in 1986, winning 22 races in 5 seasons from 1986 to 1990. He moved to Europe where his first win was in Formula Ford 1600 at England's Donington Park. In the 1992 Formula Opel-Lotus Benelux Series Brown secured top-ten finishes in each of the season's races. The following year Brown finished 4th in the series.

Brown has competed on both sides of the Atlantic, contesting North America's Toyota Atlantic Series in addition to the Formula Opel-Lotus Benelux Series and 1994 British Formula Three Championship. Brown made his Indy Lights debut at Laguna Seca in 1995 and competed in a German Formula Three Championship race in 1996.

In 1997 Brown finished second in the GT2 category in the 24 Hours at Daytona with Roock Racing in a factory-supported Porsche 911 GT2. He also finished second in the 1997 12 Hours of Sebring.

2000 and beyond 
Brown took a sabbatical from professional racing between 2001–2005 to concentrate on JMI. In 2006 he returned to the track with an entry in the Britcar 24 Hours race, winning his class as a member of the driver line-up for Moore International Motorsport. In 2007 he contested the Ferrari Challenge Series as part of a six-car stable fielded by Ferrari of Washington. At his debut in Fontana he started in pole position and led every lap of the race to take victory. The following year Brown returned to full-time competition, with his Ferrari Challenge Series campaign highlighted by a win at Circuit Gilles Villeneuve in Montreal.

In 2009 Brown and Richard Dean co-founded United Autosports. In 2010 the team scored a third-place finish in the GT3 category at the Total 24 Hours of Spa and recorded its maiden class victory in the 2011 British GT Championship at Snetterton. In 2012, the team raced in both the Blancpain Endurance Series with a McLaren MP4-12C and the British GT Championship with an Audi R8 LMS. The team also competed in the Dubai 12 Hour race, the Bathurst 12 Hour, Macau GT Cup and the Spa 24 Hours. Brown himself won the last round of the British GT Championship at Donington Park with Álvaro Parente as a wild card entry for the team in a McLaren MP4-12C GT3.

In 2013 Brown competed in a full season of the British GT Championship with United Autosports in a McLaren MP4-12C GT3. Brown still races regularly in Historic events, such as the Grand Prix de Monaco Historique.

United Autosports 
United Autosports, one of the largest motorsport teams in the UK and competing globally in different sports prototype and GT categories across the world, is co-owned by Brown and racing driver Richard Dean. Founded in 2009, the team has raced in a number of championships using a variety of different cars across several classes and categories, with drivers including Fernando Alonso, Juan Pablo Montoya, Lando Norris and Paul di Resta. The team currently competes in the FIA World Endurance Championship, European Le Mans Series, Michelin Le Mans Cup and GT4 European Series. It has also recorded podium success in other events around the world, such as the Macau GT Cup, the Spa 24 Hours, the Abu Dhabi 12 Hours and the Bathurst 12 Hour race in Australia.

United Autosports also operates a Historic Division, restoring, preparing and managing a range of historic sportscars and F1 race cars, some from Brown's own collection, as well as for customers. These compete globally at such events as the Rolex Monterey Motorsports Reunion, the Silverstone Classic, Monaco Historics, Le Mans Classic, Spa Classic, Nürburgring Old Timers, and Goodwood Festival of Speed.

In 2021, United Autosports entered the inaugural Extreme E series, pairing with Andretti Autosport to enter the Andretti United XE team. When McLaren formed its own Extreme E program in 2022, Brown stressed he was a "silent partner" in Andretti United XE and that he would exclusively focus on McLaren.

McLaren Technology Group & McLaren Racing 
On November 21, 2016, Brown was announced as executive director of McLaren Technology Group. On April 10, 2018, Brown became the chief executive officer of McLaren Racing as part of an operational restructure of the McLaren Group. As CEO, Brown has overall responsibility for the business, including strategic direction, operational performance, marketing and commercial development.

Car collection
Brown's car collection is primarily housed in the workshop of United Autosports, the sports car team Brown jointly owns with Richard Dean.

The collection includes:

 Ayrton Senna's 1991 Monaco Grand Prix-winning McLaren MP4/6
 Dale Earnhardt's 1984 Chevrolet Monte Carlo NASCAR stock car
 Porsche 959 modified by Canepa
 Porsche 962, chassis 120
 Jaguar XJR-10
 McLaren Speedtail Pre-Production 1 (PP1), painted in Sienna Black
 Ferrari F50, painted in Giallo Modena
 McLaren M8D
 Mika Hakkinen's  2001 British Grand Prix winning MP4/16
 Nigel Mansell's 1993 IndyCar title winning Lola T93/00

References

External links

McLaren Racing page

1971 births
Rolex Sports Car Series drivers
Living people
Racing drivers from Los Angeles
24 Hours of Daytona drivers
American Le Mans Series drivers
FIA GT Championship drivers
German Formula Three Championship drivers
Indy Lights drivers
British Formula Three Championship drivers
Atlantic Championship drivers
EFDA Nations Cup drivers
Formula Ford drivers
British GT Championship drivers
Blancpain Endurance Series drivers
Barber Pro Series drivers
McLaren people
24 Hours of Spa drivers
United Autosports drivers
Meyer Shank Racing drivers